N'Faly Kouyate is a Guinean musician.  He is a member of the Mandinka ethnic group of West Africa.  His father was the griot Konkoba Kabinet Kouyate, who lived in Siguiri, Guinea.

In 1994 Kouyate moved to Belgium and formed the ensemble Dunyakan (The Voice of the World). In 1997, he was invited to join the Afro Celt Sound System providing vocals, playing the kora, and balafon, collaborating with the others in the band to compose songs that blended music from Ireland with that of West African countries including his native Guinea.

References

External links
N'Faly Kouyate article
Dunyakan site
 Spinning around the source. Slumbering stories in and around Siguiri. Article by Rachel Laget based on anthropological field research. (www.xpeditions.eu)

See also
Kora (instrument)

Guinean Kora players
Year of birth missing (living people)
Living people
People from Siguiri
Afro Celt Sound System members